Alexander Radčenko (born 5 July 1973) is a Czech handball
player, currently playing for HT Tatran Prešov in the Slovak Extraliga.
He also plays for the Czech national handball team.
He also played in SKIF Krasnodar, Istochnik Rostov-on-Don, Baník OKD Karviná, Pallamano Conversano, MT Melsungen and Italgest Casara

External links
 Alexander Radčenko profile
 Profile at ehfcl.com

Czech male handball players
1973 births
Living people

trenuje výborného hráča Radovana Šulíka